Richard Rowe may refer to:

Richard Rowe (writer) (1828–1879), English author and journalist, also active in Australia
Richard Rowe (horse racing) (born 1959), British horse jockey and trainer
Richard Reynolds Rowe (1824–1899), English architect
Richard Yates Rowe (1888–1973), American politician and businessman
Dick Rowe (1921–1986), American talent scout for Decca Records 
Richard Rowe (priest) (XVth century), Archdeacon of Armagh